Serge Zwikker (born April 28, 1973) is a Dutch former basketball player.

High School career
Zwikker, the son of a police officer and a mother who worked in the flower business, first came to the United States in 1988, playing for Don Kent at Monsignor Clancy Memorial High School in Queens, New York. He then transferred to Flint Hill Preparatory School, and then finished his prep career at Harker Prep in Potomac, Maryland. Zwikker was a 1992 McDonald's All-American.

College career
After redshirting one year, he played four years of college basketball for the University of North Carolina at Chapel Hill under coach Dean Smith. He saw limited playing time his first two years, usually coming off the bench for Rasheed Wallace. Zwikker's college career breakthrough came March 17, 1995 against Murray State University. Plagued by an ankle injury, Wallace scored only six points before Smith went to the uninjured Zwikker in relief. Zwikker went on to score 19 points as he and Jerry Stackhouse led the Tar Heels to an 80–70 win. Zwikker became the Tar Heels' starting center following Wallace's departure in the 1995 NBA Draft. As a senior, he averaged 11.5 points and 8.1 rebounds per game, while serving as a team captain with Shammond Williams.

Professional career

Houston Rockets (1997–1998)
Zwikker was selected by the Houston Rockets with the first pick of the second round (29th overall) in the 1997 NBA Draft, and spent one season on the Rockets' bench. However, he did not record any playing time. Due to the 1998 NBA lockout, he signed a three-year contract with TAU Cerámica in Vitoria-Gasteiz, Spain.

On January 22, 1999, the Rockets renounced the rights to Zwikker.

Return to Europe (1998–2000)
Zwikker played Euroleague basketball in 1998–99, first playing for TAU Cerámica in Vitoria-Gasteiz, Spain, and then for Gorizia in Italy. After only ten games with Gorizia, his season ended due to a back injury. At the beginning of the 2000-01 season, he played three games for Conesco Den Helder in his native Netherlands.

National team 
Zwikker played in the 1990 European Championship for Junior Men and later also represented the Dutch men's national team.

Personal life
After his basketball career ended, Zwikker, who had earned a degree in communication, started a career in IT in the United States.

Zwikker has two daughters, Courtney (2001) and Ellen (2003). They both play college volleyball; Courtney plays for Barry University and Ellen plays for Eckerd College. These schools are both a part of the NCAA Division II's Sunshine State Conference, so the sisters will be competing against each other.

Notes

External links
Zwikker's player page on basketball-reference.com

1973 births
Living people
American men's basketball players
CB Breogán players
Centers (basketball)
Den Helder Kings players
Dutch expatriate basketball people in Spain
Dutch expatriate basketball people in the United States
Dutch men's basketball players
Houston Rockets draft picks
Liga ACB players
McDonald's High School All-Americans
North Carolina Tar Heels men's basketball players
Parade High School All-Americans (boys' basketball)
Saski Baskonia players
Sportspeople from Maassluis